Cyperus prolixus is a species of sedge that is native to southern parts of North America, Central America and tropical parts of South America.

The species was first formally described by the botanist Carl Sigismund Kunth in 1816.

See also
 List of Cyperus species

References

prolixus
Plants described in 1816
Taxa named by Carl Sigismund Kunth
Flora of Mexico
Flora of Argentina
Flora of Belize
Flora of Bolivia
Flora of Brazil
Flora of Colombia
Flora of Costa Rica
Flora of Ecuador
Flora of Guatemala
Flora of Guyana
Flora of Honduras
Flora of Louisiana
Flora of Panama
Flora of Paraguay
Flora of Peru
Flora of Suriname
Flora of Uruguay
Flora of Venezuela